There have been several Greco-Turkish Wars:
Orlov Revolt (1770) Greeks' first major Revolt against the Ottoman Empire with the support of Russia
Greek War of Independence (1821–1830), against the Ottoman Empire
Cretan Revolt (1841)
Undeclared war in 1854 during the Crimean War, with Greek irregulars invading Ottoman Epirus (Epirus Revolt of 1854) and Thessaly 
Cretan Revolt (1866-1869)
Greece and the Ottoman Empire fought a brief border war in Thessaly during the Great Eastern Crisis and the 1878 Macedonian rebellion, Epirus Revolt of 1878 and Cretan revolt (1878)
First Greco-Turkish War (1897) 
Cretan Revolt (1897-1898)
Greek front of the First Balkan War (1912–13)
World War 1 (1914-18) Greece and the Ottoman Empire were in the opposing alliances and fought in the Mediterranean and the Balkans Theatre in the Battle of Imbros and during the Allied occupation of Constantinople
Second Greco-Turkish War (1919–1922), also called the Asia Minor Campaign or the Western Front of the Turkish War of Independence

This term may also refer to the medieval predecessor civilisations of Greece and Turkey:
Byzantine–Seljuk wars (1046–1180)
Byzantine–Ottoman wars (1299–1479)

See also
Aegean dispute
Greece–Turkey relations
Turkish invasion of Cyprus